Kulhánek (feminine Kulhánková) is a Czech surname. Notable people with the surname include:

Jiří Kulhánek (born 1967), Czech writer
Oldřich Kulhánek (born 1940), Czech artist, painter and graphic artist
Ota Kulhánek (born 1935), Czech-Swedish seismologist
Vladimír Guma Kulhánek (born 1944), Czech electric bassist

Czech-language surnames
Surnames from nicknames